Christopher Ian Brian Mynott Philp (born 6 July 1976) is a British politician serving as Minister of State for Crime, Policing and Fire since October 2022. He served as Minister for the Cabinet Office and Paymaster General in October 2022. A member of the Conservative Party, he has been the Member of Parliament (MP) for Croydon South since May 2015. 

In August 2019, he was appointed Parliamentary Private Secretary to Chancellor of the Exchequer Sajid Javid. In September 2019, he was appointed by Prime Minister Boris Johnson as Parliamentary Under-Secretary of State for the Ministry of Justice and in February 2020 at the Home Office. He was also briefly the Minister for London from December 2019 to February 2020. He was moved to the position of Parliamentary Under-Secretary of State for Tech and the Digital Economy by Johnson in the September 2021 reshuffle. He resigned from this post during the July 2022 government crisis. After Johnson resigned in July 2022, Philp supported Liz Truss’s bid to become Conservative leader. Following Truss's appointment as Prime Minister, she appointed Philp as Chief Secretary to the Treasury in September 2022. When Kwasi Kwarteng was dismissed as Chancellor in October 2022, Philp was replaced as Chief Secretary to the Treasury by Edward Argar and in turn succeeded Argar as Paymaster General.

Early years
Philp attended the selective St Olave's Grammar School in Orpington, Kent, and then studied physics at University College, Oxford. In 1996 he was editor of the Oxford University student newspaper, Cherwell.

Business career
Philp worked for McKinsey & Company before co-founding distribution business Blueheath Holdings, in 2000. It was floated on the AIM before merging with Booker Cash & Carry as part of the Booker Group in a £375 million deal.

With fellow future Conservative Party MP Sam Gyimah, he founded Clearstone Training and Recruitment Limited, an HGV training provider, which went into liquidation owing nearly 4 million to its customers, many of which were long term unemployed.. Philp also founded property development lender Pluto Finance and Moreof Silverstone, which are registered in Jersey. He founded the charity 'The Next Big Thing' which was dissolved owing to insufficient funds.

Political career
Philp was Chairman of the Bow Group, a Conservative Party think tank, from 2004 to 2005. Philp defeated the Labour Leader of Camden Council to become a councillor in the Gospel Oak ward of Camden in May 2006 with a swing of over 10%, the first Conservative to win the ward in over 20 years. He did not stand at the 2010 local elections.

At the 2010 general election, Philp was the Conservative parliamentary candidate for Hampstead and Kilburn, losing by 42 votes to Labour's sitting MP Glenda Jackson, but increasing the Conservative vote share by nearly 10 percentage points compared to the previous election.

Philp's book Conservative Revival: Blueprint for a Better Britain was published in conjunction with the Bow Group and was co-authored by 10 Conservative MPs, or recent candidates in their 30s, and with a foreword written by David Cameron, the then Leader of the Opposition. Philp was also the author of "Work for the Dole: A proposal to fix welfare dependency", published by The Taxpayers' Alliance in September 2013. His report called for mandatory participation in community work and training in return for the continued payment of benefits payments.

In November 2013, Philp was selected to be the Conservative parliamentary candidate for Croydon South. The seat was held by the Conservative MP Richard Ottaway, who was retiring at the next general election. On 7 May 2015, Philp was elected as the Member of Parliament for Croydon South, with a majority of over 17,000, the highest achieved in the constituency for over 20 years. Shortly after being elected to Parliament, Philp became the first of the 2015 Conservative intake to be elected by other MPs to the influential Treasury Select Committee.

Philp wrote "Restoring Responsible Ownership", a report on corporate rules which recommended greater shareholder control over company directors' appointments and pay. Philp's proposals received positive coverage for mounting "pressure" and arguing that "asset managers had to do much more to engage with companies, in particular to exert some degree of control over executive pay".

Philp was opposed to Brexit before the 2016 European membership referendum.  Philp supports selective grammar schools, arguing for one to open a satellite in his constituency to circumvent a ban in England on new selective schools and the borough council's own non-selective policy. In May 2016, when debating the Government's Starter Homes Initiative, Philp was accused by housing charities of failing to understand how a couple buying a house for the first time cannot afford a £10,000 deposit. Responding to criticism, he stated "No one says it is easy, the average age of a first time buyer these days is about 30 so people have 10 years to save £5,000."

Philp has been an outspoken critic of Govia Thameslink Railway's ownership of Southern Rail; in 2017, Philp called for the government to take control of the Southern Rail franchise and for cross-party support in ending disputes between Southern Rail and the RMT Union. He also proposed a Private Member's Bill to ban "unreasonable" and "damaging" strikes on essential services, including trains. 

Following the 2017 general election, Philp was appointed Parliamentary Private Secretary (PPS) to HM Treasury Ministers. Philp was made PPS to Sajid Javid then Secretary of State for the Ministry Housing, Communities and Local Government on 22 January 2018. Between December 2018 to May 2019 he was the Conservative Party Vice Chairman for Policy. In August 2019, he was appointed as PPS to Sajid Javid, Chancellor of the Exchequer. Philp had backed Javid in the 2019 Conservative Party leadership election. In September 2019, he was appointed Parliamentary Under Secretary for the Ministry of Justice. He then served as Parliamentary Under-Secretary of State for Immigration Compliance and Courts. He replaced Matt Warman as Parliamentary Under-Secretary of State for Digital in September 2021.

On 7 July 2022, Philp resigned from government in protest at Boris Johnson's leadership following a large number of other ministerial resignations during the July 2022 United Kingdom government crisis.

Philp was appointed by Liz Truss as Chief Secretary to the Treasury and made a member of the Privy Council of the United Kingdom. Truss demoted him 38 days later and dismissed Chancellor Kwasi Kwarteng. Philp was instead demoted to Minister for the Cabinet Office and Paymaster General, the two positions that Edward Argar had previously held.

Upon the appointment of Rishi Sunak as Prime Minister on 25 October 2022, Philp left the Cabinet and became Minister of State for Crime, Policing and Fire in the Home Office, in a straight job swap with Jeremy Quin.

Personal life
Philp married his wife Elizabeth in 2009. Their twins, a boy and a girl, were born prematurely in April 2013, and spent an extended period in intensive care following their birth. Philp's father Brian stood as a candidate for the United Kingdom Independence Party at Orpington in the 2017 general election.

Notes

References

External links

1976 births
20th-century British businesspeople
21st-century British businesspeople
Alumni of University College, Oxford
Conservative Party (UK) councillors
McKinsey & Company people
Conservative Party (UK) MPs for English constituencies
Councillors in the London Borough of Camden
Living people
People educated at St Olave's Grammar School
People from West Wickham
UK MPs 2015–2017
UK MPs 2017–2019
UK MPs 2019–present
Members of the Privy Council of the United Kingdom
United Kingdom Paymasters General
Chief Secretaries to the Treasury